The Cruel World Festival is an annual music festival held at the Brookside at the Rose Bowl in Pasadena, California. It was founded in 2020, and is organized by FKOA / Goldenvoice, a subsidiary of AEG Presents. The festival revolves around the new wave, post-punk, gothic rock and alternative rock genres.  In the park, several stages continuously host live music.

Cruel World Festival showcases popular and established musical artists as well as reunited groups. The first edition in May 2022 featured Morrissey, Bauhaus, Blondie among more than 25 artists. A second edition of the festival was announced for May 20, 2023, featuring Siouxsie and Iggy Pop as headliners with a run of 20 other artists including Billy Idol, Love and Rockets, Echo & the Bunnymen and the Human League.

History
In 2020, promoters FKOA / Goldenvoice decided to create a one-day festival at the golf course Brookside which is located next to the Rose Bowl, in Pasadena, CA. The first lineup was released on February 11, 2020, with the inaugural festival set to take place on May 2. The festival was first postponed to September due to the worldwide pandemic, then canceled entirely in May. In June 2021, Goldenvoice announced that the inaugural festival would finally take place on May 14, 2022, with minor lineup alterations.

The inaugural edition featured a line-up with artists who mainly rose to fame in the late 1970s and the 1980s. The headliner of the first edition was Morrissey. The other headliners were Bauhaus. Blondie, Devo, the Psychedelic Furs and the Church. More than 25 bands were on the bill and congregated in Pasadena, California on May 14, 2022. The festival was a way to "revive the ’80s", with "some of the biggest names" from the 1980s new wave and gothic rock scenes. As tickets sold out for the first day, a second day with the same line-up was added on Sunday May 15. Los Angeles Times wrote: "Cruel World time-travels back to that moment when synthesizers were supplanting guitars and rebel teens born into baby boomer hegemony were hungrily seeking new sounds, ideas and hairdos".

In the early part of 2022, a Facebook Group was created for fans of the music genre and the Cruel World Festival to gather and share their love and dedication. It's gown substantially, and administrators of the group have created a community with special events, etc.  CWFA on Facebook

In January 2023, the second edition of Cruel World Fest was announced: it will take place at the same location on Saturday May 20, 2023. Tickets went on sale on Friday January 27. The 2023 edition features Siouxsie and Iggy Pop as headliners with Billy Idol, Love and Rockets, Echo & the Bunnymen, the Human League, Adam Ant, Gary Numan, Gang of Four, ABC, and fifteen other artists. It will be Siouxsie's first performance in North America in 15 years. The 2023 edition will also see the reunion of Love and Rockets (formely Bauhaus) who hadn't performed under this banner for 15 years.

References

External links

The Cruel World Festival official website

1999 establishments in California
Art festivals in the United States
Art in Greater Los Angeles
Pasadena, California
Music festivals in California
Pop music festivals in the United States
Rock festivals in the United States